George Brown Sorlie (1885–1948) was an English-born theatrical entrepreneur famous for his work in Australia, particularly his touring tent shows which took pantomime, musical comedy and vaudeville around the country. He was an early employer of Peter Finch. He was also a popular recording artist.

External links
George Sorlie at Australian Dictionary of Biography
George Sorlie  at Live Performance Hall of Fame
Sample program from one of his shows
George Sorlie at Australian Variety Theatre Archive
George Sorlie Vaudeville and Revue Company at Australian Variety Theatre Archive
Selection of George Sorlie songs at Internet Archive
Biographical cuttings of George Sorlie at National Library of Australia

Australian male stage actors
1885 births
1948 deaths
Australian theatre managers and producers
British emigrants to Australia